Arthrobacter crystallopoietes is a bacterium species from the genus of Arthrobacter which has been isolated from soil. Arthrobacter crystallopoietes has the ability to degrade pyridine.

References

Further reading

External links
Type strain of Arthrobacter crystallopoietes at BacDive -  the Bacterial Diversity Metadatabase

Bacteria described in 1963
Micrococcaceae